Peace is the second studio album by German electronica act York. The album is a mixture of trance, pop and Chill-Out.
Even though York is commonly known for their trance and House tracks, this time the two brothers have changed their path. With Peace they are focusing more on downtempo productions, in order to describe and catch the atmosphere of their home island Ibiza.
CD two features completely new remixes by renowned producers that represent the state of the art in the field of dance music; remixes by producers such as Roger Shah, Aly & Fila and Airwave.

Track listing

References

External links 
 , 

2006 albums
York (group) albums